Ironheart is an upcoming American television series created by Chinaka Hodge for the streaming service Disney+, based on the Marvel Comics character of the same name. It is intended to be part of the Marvel Cinematic Universe (MCU) produced by Marvel Studios, sharing continuity with the films of the franchise. Hodge serves as head writer. The series is also produced by Proximity Media and 20th Television.

Dominique Thorne reprises her role as Riri Williams / Ironheart from the film Black Panther: Wakanda Forever (2022). The series was announced in December 2020, along with Thorne's casting. Hodge was hired in April 2021, with additional castings revealed in February 2022. Sam Bailey and Angela Barnes joined to direct in April 2022. Filming began at Trilith Studios in Atlanta, Georgia by early June, before moving to Chicago in late October, and concluded by early November.

Ironheart is expected to premiere on Disney+ and will consist of six episodes. It will be part of Phase Five of the MCU.

Cast and characters 
 Dominique Thorne as Riri Williams / Ironheart: An MIT student and genius inventor from Chicago who created a suit of armor that rivals the one built by Tony Stark / Iron Man.
 Anthony Ramos as Parker Robbins / The Hood:An ally of Williams's who dons a hood that allows him to tap into dark arts and magic. Ramos said Robbins was complex and a misfit who "wants to take in other misfits and show the world that you looked at us as outcasts but we're going to end up on top".

Additionally, Jim Rash reprises his role as the Dean of MIT from Captain America: Civil War (2016). Lyric Ross has been cast as Williams's best friend, while Harper Anthony, Manny Montana, Alden Ehrenreich, Shea Couleé, Zoe Terakes, Regan Aliyah, Shakira Barrera, Rashida "Sheedz" Olayiwola, Sonia Denis, Paul Calderón, and Cree Summer have been cast in undisclosed roles.

Episodes 

The series will consist of six episodes, with Sam Bailey directing the first three and Angela Barnes directing the last three.

Production

Development 
A film based on the Marvel Comics character Riri Williams / Ironheart had a script written by Jada Rodriguez by July 2018, when it was listed on The Black List, although this did not materialize. In December 2020, Marvel Studios President Kevin Feige announced the Disney+ television series Ironheart. In April 2021, Chinaka Hodge was hired to serve as head writer of the series. In March 2022, series actor Anthony Ramos revealed that Ryan Coogler, the director of Black Panther (2018) and its sequel Black Panther: Wakanda Forever (2022), was involved in the production; star Dominique Thorne first appears as Riri Williams / Ironheart in Wakanda Forever, and Coogler's production company Proximity Media was set to work alongside Marvel Studios on select Disney+ series as part of a television deal with Walt Disney Television.

In April, Coogler's Proximity Media was confirmed to be producing the series, when Sam Bailey and Angela Barnes joined to each direct three episodes of the series. Ironheart will consist of six episodes. Executive producers on the series include Marvel Studios' Feige, Louis D'Esposito, Victoria Alonso, Brad Winderbaum, and Zoie Nagelhout, Proximity Media's Coogler, Zinzi Coogler, and Sev Ohanian, and Hodge. 20th Television also produces the series.

Writing 
Francesca J. Gailes, Jacqueline Gailes, Malarie Howard, Amir K. Sulaiman, and Cristian Martinez serve as writers for the series, with the Gailes both previously writing on She-Hulk: Attorney at Law (2022). The writers' room for the series was set to begin in May 2021. Feige felt the conflict between Williams's technology and the magic of Parker Robbins / The Hood made the series unique within the MCU. Marvel Studios executive Nate Moore described the series as a direct sequel to Wakanda Forever by exploring "interesting repercussions" of Williams's experiences in that film when she returns to her home.

Casting 
Dominique Thorne was revealed to have been cast as Riri Williams / Ironheart with the series' announcement, after Marvel Studios offered her the role without auditioning; Thorne had previously auditioned for Black Panther (2018) and was told then by Marvel Studios that they wanted to work with her on a future project after she had more experience. In February 2022, Anthony Ramos joined the series as Parker Robbins / The Hood, described as a "key role" and the series' main villain. Deadline Hollywood reported that his role would expand to other MCU projects, similar to how Jonathan Majors appeared as He Who Remains in the first season of Loki (2021) ahead of his appearance as Kang the Conqueror in Ant-Man and the Wasp: Quantumania (2023). Later that month, Lyric Ross was cast as Williams's best friend. Newcomer Harper Anthony joined the cast in an undisclosed role by April, followed by Manny Montana in June. A month later, Alden Ehrenreich joined the cast in a "key role".

From August to October 2022, Shea Couleé, Zoe Terakes, Regan Aliyah, Shakira Barrera, Rashida "Sheedz" Olayiwola, Sonia Denis, Paul Calderón, and Cree Summer joined the cast in undisclosed roles. At the D23 Expo in September, Jim Rash was revealed to be reprising his role as the Dean of MIT from Captain America: Civil War (2016). The following month, Deadline Hollywood reported that Sacha Baron Cohen had joined the MCU, in a role that would see him potentially first appear in the later episodes of Ironheart followed by appearances in other MCU projects. His role was likely to be the character Mephisto, which would be portrayed by Baron Cohen in-person as well as through CGI.

Design 
Andrew Menzies serves as the production designer for the series.

Filming 
Filming for the series occurred in Chicago in late May 2022, to capture plate shots and exterior establishing shots. Principal photography had begun by June 2, at Trilith Studios in Atlanta, Georgia, under the working title Wise Guy, with Bailey and Barnes directing. Filming occurred in September on Edgewood Avenue in Sweet Auburn, Atlanta, at a building constructed to stand in for a White Castle in Chicago. Filming was scheduled to move to Chicago by October 24, 2022, to run through November 3, in South Side, Near North Side, and Downtown Chicago. Filming had wrapped by early November 2022.

Post-production 
Cedric Nairn-Smith serves as an editor. Smith previously worked on the Marvel Studios series Moon Knight (2022).

Marketing 
Footage from the series was shown at the 2022 D23 Expo.

Release 
Ironheart was expected to premiere on Disney+ in late 2023, and will consist of six episodes. However, by February 2023 the series was unlikely to premiere that year as Disney and Marvel Studios were re-evaluating their content output. It will be part of Phase Five of the MCU.

References

External links 
  at Marvel.com
 

2020s American science fiction television series

American action television series
American black superhero television shows
American television spin-offs
Disney+ original programming
English-language television shows
Marvel Cinematic Universe: Phase Five television series
Mass media in Chicago
Superheroine television shows
Television about magic
Television series based on works by Brian Michael Bendis
Television series by 20th Century Fox Television
Television series by Marvel Studios
Television shows about technology
Television shows filmed at Trilith Studios
Television shows filmed in Atlanta
Television shows filmed in Illinois
Upcoming television series